"Kimi no Heart wa Marine Blue" (Japanese: 君のハートはマリンブルー, English: Your Heart Is Marine Blue) is the third single by Kiyotaka Sugiyama & Omega Tribe, released by VAP on January 21, 1984. The single peaked at No. 12 on the Oricon chart.

The song was used as the theme song for the TBS drama Toshigorokazoku and reached the top ten in The Best Ten and The Top Ten, following the band's debut with "Summer Suspicion." The song made an appearance on the Fuji TV program Yoru no Hit Studio on April 9, 1984.

Track listing

Single

Charts

Weekly charts

Year-end charts

References 

Omega Tribe (Japanese band) songs
1984 singles
Songs with lyrics by Chinfa Kan
Songs written by Tetsuji Hayashi